The Dubai Moonlight Classic is a professional golf tournament on the Ladies European Tour (LET). The event was played for the first time in October 2006. Its prize fund of €500,000 made it the fourth most valuable tournament on the LET. Between 2009 and 2020, Swiss luxury watch company Omega was the tournament's title sponsor. Promoted and organised by Golf In Dubai, the tournament is played on the Faldo course at Emirates Golf Club, which also hosts the Dubai Desert Classic on the men's European Tour.

Annika Sörenstam won the event the first two times it was played. Sörenstam beat out Karrie Webb in 2006, and in 2007 defeated Iben Tinning by two shots. The 2008 event, which was Sörenstam's final tournament before her retirement, was won by Germany's Anja Monke. The 2016 event was shortened to 54 holes after caddie Maximilian Zechmann collapsed and died during the first round.

Winners

References

External links

Ladies European Tour - official site
Tournament management

Ladies European Tour events
Golf tournaments in the United Arab Emirates
Sports competitions in Dubai
Recurring sporting events established in 2006
2006 establishments in the United Arab Emirates
Winter events in the United Arab Emirates